A recognised independent centre (RIC) of Oxford University is a status awarded to acknowledge a special relationship with a small number of institutes and centres which are involved in teaching and research in their specialised areas in Oxford.

Overview
RICs are educational charities based in the Oxford area which, while not part of the university, are recognised for their contribution to university research and teaching in contemporary and historical areas of interest. The formal designation was created in 2006. Five institutions have so far been awarded RIC status.

While the RICs remain independent financially and in governance they make a significant contribution to the university in research, tuition, and publishing. The university has established a Joint Coordinating Committee for Recognised Independent Centres, which links the university and RICs. The University Council and relevant faculties nominate members to sit on the governing bodies of the RICs.

A student at an RIC is not automatically a member of the university but can apply to use its facilities, as well as its libraries and manuscript collections. In practice the majority of students attached to RICs will also be registered as students of Oxford University, and be members of colleges. Some academics hold joint appointments made between university faculties and RICs.

As well as participating in university-wide research and teaching, the RICs interact with each other. Shaunaka Rishi Das, the founder of the Oxford Centre for Hindu Studies, was mentored in establishing his centre by Professor David Patterson, the founder of the Oxford Centre for Hebrew and Jewish Studies.

Whatever its specialist interest, each RIC helps to link distinct communities and cultures with scholars, the government, and the media in a fast-paced critical dialogue.

Current recognised independent centres of Oxford University

References

External links
Recognised Independent Centres
The Oxford Centre for Buddhist Studies
The Oxford Institute for Energy Studies
The Oxford Centre for Hebrew and Jewish Studies
The Oxford Centre for Hindu Studies
The Oxford Centre for Islamic Studies

Charities based in Oxfordshire
Education in Oxford
Educational charities based in the United Kingdom
Organisations associated with the University of Oxford